The Newport American Legion Community Hut is a historic log meeting hall in Remmel Park, north of Remmel Avenue, in Newport, Arkansas.  It is a single-story structure, with a gable roof, and a front porch with a shed roof supported by log columns.  The interior has retained all of its exposed log framing.  A storage building, also built of logs at the same time, stands nearby.  The hall was built in 1934 as part of the improvements to Remmel Park, and was designed to serve both the local American Legion chapter and the community.

The building was listed on the National Register of Historic Places in 1992.

See also
National Register of Historic Places listings in Jackson County, Arkansas

References

Cultural infrastructure completed in 1934
Buildings and structures in Jackson County, Arkansas
American Legion buildings
Clubhouses on the National Register of Historic Places in Arkansas
National Register of Historic Places in Jackson County, Arkansas
1934 establishments in Arkansas
Newport, Arkansas